Finland has produced postage stamps for use since 1856.

Early history: background
In the war of 1808-1809, Russian troops conquered Finland. Finland had been a part of Sweden and was annexed to the Russian empire at the Peace Treaty of Hamina on 17 September 1809. Finland became an autonomous Grand Duchy of the Russian Empire. The Russian Tsar Alexander I (1801-1825) promised that Finland could uphold the existing religion, the basic laws and privileges of the social order.

Finland was allowed to manage its affairs and employment of its own civil servants. A parliament began to assemble from the year 1863 - the same year where Finnish language got official status and became equal with the Swedish language. In 1865, Finland got its own currency - penni and markka - which quickly turned out to be stronger than the Russian Rouble. From the 1860s, trading - import and export - grow rapidly. Population grew from 1 million in 1809 to over 3 million by the end of World War I.

When Alexander III ascended the throne in 1881, a process of making Finland a more integrated part of the empire started - many attacks were made in the Russian public on the special rights of the Finnish people and efforts were undertaken to abolish these special rights granted to them, and by many small steps this led to the Russification of the Finnish Post.

Personalised stamps
The Finnish Post Office now offers a service by which the purchaser of postage stamps can have their own chosen image personalized onto the face of a postage stamp. The user uploads the image to the post office web site and pays a fee over and above the price of a normal postage stamp.

See also
 Postage stamps and postal history of the Åland Islands
 Postage stamps and postal history of Karelia
 Tom of Finland stamps

References

Further reading
 Dromberg, D. A. Suomen postimerkit 1923-1973 historian ja tekniikan valossa. Helsinki: Suomen Pankin setelipiano: Posti- ja lernnätinhallitus, 1974 208p.
 Grosfils-Berger, P. Finlande: les timbres des premières émissions de 1856 à 1889-95. Brussels: s.n., 1947 325p.
 Jutikkala, Eino. Suomen Postilaitoksen Historia 1638–1938 1. Ruotsin vallan aika. Helsinki: Posti- ja lennätinlaitos, 1938 313p.
 NORMA Suomi Erikoisluettelo, 1845-1990 = NORMA Finland Special Catalogue, 1845-1990. Helsinki: Suomen Postimerkkeily Oy, 1990 280p.
 Nurmio, Yrjö. Suomen Postilaitoksen Historia 1638–1938 2. Suomen postilaitos vuosina 1808–1870. Helsinki: Posti- ja lennätinlaitos, 1938 317p.
 Olamo, Juhani. Suomen filateelisen kirjallisuuden bibliografia = Bibliography of Finnish philatelic literature. Helsinki: Suomen Filatelistiliitto, 1980 . Series Title:	Suomen Filatelistiliiton julkaisusarjan julkaisu; 5. A second volume was published in 2005.
 Osmonsalo, Erkki K. Suomen Postilaitoksen Historia 1638–1938 3.  Ajanjakso 1870–1938. Helsinki: Posti- ja lennätinlaitos, 1938 396p.
 Ossa, Mikko. Suomi--Filatelian Aarreaitta. Hanko: Postimerkkiliike Lauri Peltonen, 1971 152p.
 Pelander, Carl E. The Postal Issues of Finland. New York: Scott Publications, 1940 63p.
 Pietiäinen, Jukka-Pekka. Postia Kaikille: Suomen Postin Tarina 1638–1998. Helsinki: Edita, 1998  104p.
 Pietiäinen, Jukka-Pekka. Post For All: The Story of the Finnish Postal Service, 1638-1998; translated by Susan Sinisalo. Helsinki: Edita, 1998  104p.
 Poropudas, Lauri. 150 tarinaa: suomalainen postimerkki 150 vuotta = 150 små berättelser; det finska frimärket 150 år = 150 stories; 150 years of Finnish stamps. Helsinki: Suomen Posti, 2006  316p. 
 Suomen Postimerkkien Käsikirja = Handbook of Finnish stamps. Vols. I-VII. Helsinki: Suomen Filatelistiliitto = Philatelic Federation of Finland, 1975-78
 Wise, Ernest H. Stamps of Sweden and Finland: The Earlier Issues. London: Heinemann, 1975  168p. Series Title: Heinemann philatelic series; 6.

External links

 Postal History from Finland 1889 - 1918
 Pre-1946 Finnish stamps at Stampslandia

Philately of Finland
Finland